The Nigerian National Assembly delegation from Ekiti comprises three Senators representing Ekiti North, Ekiti South, and Ekiti Central, and six  Representatives representing  Ekiti Central 1, Ekiti South 1, Ekiti South 2, Ekiti North 1, Ekiti North 2, and Ekiti Central 2.

Fourth Republic

The 4th Parliament (1999 - 2003)

8th Assembly (2015-2019)

9th Assembly (2019-2023)

References

Official Website - National Assembly House of Representatives (Ekiti State)
 Senator List

Politics of Ekiti State
National Assembly (Nigeria) delegations by state